Gamma Cephei (γ Cephei, abbreviated Gamma Cep, γ Cep) is a binary star system approximately 45 light-years away in the constellation of Cepheus. The primary (designated Gamma Cephei A, officially named Errai , the traditional name of the system) is a stellar class K1 orange giant or subgiant star; it has a red dwarf companion (Gamma Cephei B). An exoplanet (designated Gamma Cephei Ab, later named Tadmor) has been confirmed to be orbiting the primary.

Gamma Cephei is the naked-eye star that will succeed Polaris as the Earth's northern pole star, due to the precession of the equinoxes. It will be closer to the northern celestial pole than Polaris around 3000 CE and will make its closest approach around 4000 CE. The 'title' will pass to Iota Cephei some time around 5200 CE.

Description
Gamma Cephei has an apparent magnitude of 3.21, nearly all of which is accounted for by Gamma Cephei A. The primary is about 3.25 billion years old and has evolved off the main sequence, having burned all of the hydrogen in its core.

The spectrum of this star has served as one of the stable anchor points by which other stars are classified. It was listed as a standard star for the spectral class K1 IV in 1943, 1953 and 1973. However, in 1989, it was given as a spectral standard for K1 III-IV. Its spectrum is notable for the strength of the cyano radical (CN) bands. Analysis of the spectrum in 2018 gave a best match for a spectral type of K1 III.

Gamma Cephei B has a mass approximately 0.40 times that of the Sun. It is probably a red dwarf of class M4, 6.2 magnitudes fainter than the primary. It is assumed to be of similar age to its primary.

γ Cephei is catalogued as a suspected variable star with a brightness range between magnitudes 3.18 and 3.24, based on its inclusion in an 1884 list of suspected variable stars.

Nomenclature
γ Cephei (Latinised to Gamma Cephei) is the system's Bayer designation. Under the rules for naming objects in multiple star systems the two components are designated A and B. Following its discovery the planet was designated Gamma Cephei Ab.

The system bore a traditional name variously spelled as Errai, Er Rai or Alrai, deriving from the Arabic الراعي (ar-rā‘ī), meaning 'the shepherd'. (The star Beta Ophiuchi is sometimes also called Alrai, but it is more commonly known as Cebalrai or Kelb Alrai, meaning 'shepherd's dog'.) In 2016, the International Astronomical Union organized a Working Group on Star Names (WGSN) to catalog and standardize proper names for stars. The WGSN's first bulletin of July 2016 included a table of the first two batches of names approved by the WGSN; which included Errai for Gamma Cephei A.

In July 2014 the International Astronomical Union launched NameExoWorlds, a process for giving proper names to certain exoplanets. The process involved public nomination and voting for the new names. In December 2015, the IAU announced the winning name was Tadmor for this planet. It was submitted by the Syrian Astronomical Association and is the ancient Semitic name and modern Arabic name for the city of Palmyra, a (UNESCO) World Heritage Site.

In Chinese, the star is named  (Shàowèi Zēng Bā, literally, the 8th added star of the Xingguan Shaowei, Shaowei: the Minor Guard) belonging to the Left Wall of the Purple Forbidden enclosure, which refers to an asterism consisting of Gamma Cephei, Iota Draconis, Theta Draconis, Eta Draconis, Zeta Draconis, Upsilon Draconis, 73 Draconis and 23 Cassiopeiae.

Planetary system
A planet orbiting Gamma Cephei A with a 2.7-year period was discovered in 1988. Its existence was also announced in 1989. This was the first-confirmed extrasolar planet and its ostensible discovery was based on the same radial velocity technique later used successfully by others. However, the claim was challenged in 1992 by a paper which favoured K-giant variability with a period equal to the stellar rotation, but in 2002, the existence of a planet with an orbital period of about 2.5 years was confirmed.

The secondary star B orbits A at only 9.8 times the semimajor axis of A's planet. The orbit of the planet is roughly perpendicular to the orbit of the binary. Dynamical modelling suggests that the Kozai–Lidov mechanism is at play here.

References

External links
 http://jumk.de/astronomie/exoplanets/errai.shtml
 McDonald Observatory: Planet Search finds first planet orbiting close-in binary star
 A Planetary Companion to the Binary Star Gamma Cephei
 SolStation: Errai 2

 
K-type subgiants
M-type main-sequence stars
Northern pole stars
Errai
Cephei, 35
116727
8974
222404
Emission-line stars
BD+76 0928
Binary stars
Planetary systems with one confirmed planet